The Transylvanian Saxon cuisine is the traditional cuisine of the Transylvanian Saxons, a German ethnic group (mostly of Luxembourgish descent) which has been living in Transylvania as well as in other parts on the territory of present-day Romania since the mid 12th century onwards. It is a type of cuisine which, most notably, shares many similarities with the Romanian cuisine and German cuisine, given the centuries-long mutual/reciprocal influence and cohabitation between the Saxons and Romanians in Transylvania, a historical region situated at the crossroads of Central and Eastern Europe.

Background 

The traditional cuisine of the Transylvanian Saxons has evolved in Transylvania, contemporary Romania, through many centuries, being in contact with the Romanian cuisine but also with the Hungarian cuisine. At core, the Transylvanian Saxon cuisine is a type of German cuisine (therefore having Western European features) which managed to incorporate external culinary/gastronomical influences stemming from both the Romanian cuisine and the Hungarian cuisine as well along the passing of time. The aromatic herb of tarragon was brought to Transylvania by the Transylvanian Saxons during the Middle Ages. Marjoram is another important herb in the traditional cuisine of the Transylvanian Saxons.

List of dishes 

Some of the dishes which are part of the Transylvanian Saxon cuisine include:

 Hanklich (also known as 'Burgberger hanklich');
 Apfelsuppe;
 Brodelawend;
 Palukes;
 Kartoffelknodel.

In addition, there are many traditional Transylvanian Saxon pastries (Transylvanian Saxon: Siweberjesch Kliegebäk) as well, most notably vanillekipferl or kipferl in general, the latter which can be filled with meat as well.

Gallery

See also 

 Romanian cuisine
 Cuisine of Luxembourg
 German cuisine
 Saxon cuisine

External links 

 Kochbücher (i.e. Recipe books) in German
 Essen und Trinken (i.e. Food and beverages) in German

Further reading 

 Saxon Cookbook by the Alliance of Transylvanian Saxons (published in 1989)

References 

European cuisine
German cuisine
Transylvanian Saxon people
Transylvania